Dominique Fabre (born in Paris in 1960) is a French novelist who focuses "on the lives of individuals on the margins of society."

Books
 Moi aussi un jour j'irai loin, 1995
 Ma vie d'Edgar, 1998
 Celui qui n'est pas là, 1999
 Fantômes, 2001
 Mon quartier, 2002
 Pour une femme de son âge, 2003
 La serveuse était nouvelle, 2005
The Waitress Was New, 2008 (English trans. Jordan Stump, Archipelago Books)
 Le Perron, 2006
 Les Types comme moi, 2007 
Guys Like Me, 2015 (English, trans. Howard Curtis, New Vessel Press)
 J'attends l'extinction des feux, 2008
 Les Prochaines Vacances, 2008
 Avant les monstres, 2009
 J'aimerais revoir Callaghan, 2010
 Il faudrait s'arracher le coeur, 2012
 Des nuages et des tours, 2013
 Photos volees, 2014
 Je t'emmenerai danser chez Lavorel, 2014
 La Mallette/Quand on a des blessures, les pas sont plus lents/Choses qui, 2014
 En passant (vite fait) par la montagne, 2015
 Les Soirees chez Mathilde, 2017
 Les Enveloppes transparentes, 2018
 Je veux rentrer chez moi, 2019

References

Living people
20th-century French novelists
21st-century French novelists
French male novelists
Writers from Paris
20th-century French male writers
21st-century French male writers
Year of birth missing (living people)